Shotts is a small town in Western Australia located in the South West region just off the Coalfields Highway between Collie and Darkan

The town originated as a railway siding named Benelaking on the Collie to Narrogin line in 1911. Later the same year the town was renamed as Shotts in honour of the coal mining town of the same name in North Lanarkshire, Scotland. The Premier Coal Mining Company operated a coal mine near to the siding and in 1913 the Company asked for a town to be established there and were supported by the Collie Road Board. The town was gazetted in 1917.

References 

Towns in Western Australia
Shire of Collie